"Parachute" is a song by English band Kaiser Chiefs. It is the lead single from their sixth studio album, Stay Together.

Weekly charts

References

2016 singles
2016 songs
Kaiser Chiefs songs
Songs written by Ricky Wilson (British musician)
Songs written by Nick "Peanut" Baines
Songs written by Simon Rix
Songs written by Andrew White (musician)
Fiction Records singles
Universal Music Group singles
Caroline Records singles